USS Chandler (DDG-996) was the final ship in the Kidd class of guided-missile destroyers operated by the U.S. Navy.  Derived from the Spruance class, these vessels were designed for air defense in hot weather. She was named after Rear Admiral Theodore E. Chandler.

Originally named Andushirvan, the ship was originally ordered by the Shah of Iran, but was undelivered when the 1979 Iranian Revolution occurred. Subsequent to this, the U.S. Navy elected to commission her for service in the Persian Gulf and Mediterranean Sea, as she was equipped with heavy-duty air conditioning and was also well suited to filtering sand and the results from NBC warfare. She was commissioned in 1982.

Chandler was decommissioned in 1999. She was transferred to the Republic of China, renamed Wu Teh (DDG-1805) in 2004, and finally recommissioned as ROCS Ma Kong (DDG-1805) in 2006.

Accident 
In June 1985, Chandler was involved in an accident on the Columbia River. The ship itself was sued under Admiralty law in the United States by a barge owner who claimed that Chandlers negligent action on the Columbia River caused a dangerous swell called a soliton.

The District Court of Oregon heard the case and held that the officers on Chandler breached their duty to exercise reasonable care in avoiding creation of the dangerous swell and the plaintiff was able to recover for the damages.

References

External links 

Navysite.de page
USSChandler.com

Kidd-class destroyers
Ships built in Pascagoula, Mississippi
1980 ships
Cold War destroyers of the United States